Kaloor is a station of Kochi Metro. It was opened on 3 October 2017 as a part of the extension of the metro system from Palarivattom to Maharaja's College. The station is located between J. L. N. Stadium and Town Hall. The name of the station refers to the region of Kaloor.

References

Kochi Metro stations
Railway stations in India opened in 2017